Roses Are Red is Bobby Vinton's third studio album, released in 1962. After Vinton's hit "Roses Are Red (My Love)" reached No. 1 (and saved Vinton from being fired from Epic Records), the eponymous album was released and made its way up to No. 5 on the Billboard 200. Shortly after the success of the song and album, Epic renewed Vinton's contract but changed his artist title from a bandleader to a solo artist.

"Roses Are Red (My Love)" is the first track on the album. Cover versions include "Sentimental Me", Cole Porter's "True Love", Roy Orbison's hit "Crying", "If I Give My Heart to You" and five country songs ("I Fall to Pieces", "Have I Told You Lately That I Love You?", "I Can't Stop Loving You", "I Can't Help It" and "Please Help Me, I'm Falling"). Vinton's 1964 No. 1 hit "Mr. Lonely" (co-written by Vinton) was originally only an album track here; its release as a single was two years later when it appeared on Bobby Vinton's Greatest Hits.

Track listing

Personnel
Robert Morgan - producer
Henry Parker - cover photo

Charts
Album - Billboard (United States)

Singles - Billboard (United States)

References

1962 albums
Bobby Vinton albums
Epic Records albums